Allium asclepiadeum  is a species of onion endemic to southern Turkey. The first collections of the species were made near the city then called Marasch, now Kahramanmaraş.

References

asclepiadeum
Onions
Flora of Turkey
Plants described in 1917
Taxa named by Joseph Friedrich Nicolaus Bornmüller